Theodor Groll, also Theodor Groll the younger (9 February 1857 – 2 April 1913 was a German genre, landscape and architect painter of the Düsseldorf school of painting.

Life 

Groll was born in Düsseldorf as the son of a glove maker and writer Theodor Groll (b. 1831). He then attended the Berlin Bauakademie, where he graduated as master builder. He later changed his discipline and became a private pupil of the Düsseldorf landscape and veduta painter Caspar Scheuren. Groll undertook numerous study trips, several times to Italy. In April 1890 he visited Rome. From 1892, he stayed in the U.S. for several years. In 1893, he was a judge at the World's Columbian Exposition in Chicago. In 1896, he travelled through southern and central German cities. Groll died in Düsseldorf at age 56.

Work 

Groll made a special name for himself with his fine, detailed architectural painting. Besides Oswald Achenbach, Albert Flamm and others he belongs to the "Italian painters" of the Düsseldorf School. At an international art auction in 2013, Groll's Afternoon in Venice was sold for 58,750 euro.

 Pompei (Blick zum Apollo-Tempel), 1891, Volmer Foundation Collection.
 Markt in Verona, ca. 1891, Museum Kunstpalast.
 Washington Street (Indianapolis At Dusk), Indianapolis Museum of Art
 Auf einer Straße vor Florenz, 1899.
 Titusbogen im Forum Romanum in Rom, 1900
 Riva am Gardasee
 Die Burg Sirmione am Gardasee, 1902
 Schloss Benrath (Blick auf das Corps de Logis)
 Piazza del Campo (Siena), 1906
 Nachmittag in Venedig, 1907
 Venedig (Die Portal della Carta zwischen San Marco und dem Dogenpalast), 1907
 Venezianischer Palazzo

References

Further reading 
 Groll, Theodor. In Ulrich Thieme, Fred. C. Willis (ed.): Allgemeines Lexikon der Bildenden Künstler von der Antike bis zur Gegenwart. BCreated by Ulrich Thieme and Felix Becker. Vol. 15: Gresse–Hanselmann. E. A. Seemann, Leipzig 1922,  (Textarchiv – Internet Archive)
 Galerie G. Paffrath: Theodor Groll. Sonderausstellung Juni–August 1968. Düsseldorf 1968.

External links 

 Auction results

19th-century German painters
19th-century German male artists
20th-century German painters
20th-century German male artists
German landscape painters
German genre painters
1857 births
1913 deaths
Artists from Düsseldorf